South Africa competed in the 2010 Commonwealth Games held in Delhi, India, from 3 to 14 October 2010.
The South African team of athletes and officials that will do duty at the 19th Commonwealth Games in New Delhi, India between 3–14 October:

This was the fifth occasion that South Africa has been represented at the Commonwealth Games since re-joining the Commonwealth in 1994 after a break of 33 years during the international sports isolation period.

Medalists

| align="left" valign="top"|

| align="left" valign="top"|

Aquatics

Aquatics:
 Wendy Trott
 Heerden Herman
 Chad le Clos
 Gideon Louw
 Mark Randall
 Roland Schoeman
 Riaan Schoeman
 Darian Townsend
 Cameron van der Burgh

Para Swim:
 Natalie du Toit

Archery

 Jorina Coetzee
 Jacobus de Wet
 Septimus Cilliers
 Nico Benade

Boxing

 Papish Baloyi
 Siphiwe Lusizi
 Masana Manganyi
 Lebogang Pilane

Cycling

 Robyn de Groot
 Ashleigh Moolman
 Anriette Schoeman
 Carla Swart
 Cherise Taylor
 Marissa van der Merwe
 Dean Edwards
 Robert Hunter
 Daryl Impey
 Darren Lill
 Jay Thompson
 Christoff van Heerden
 Jaco Venter

Gymnastics

Artistic
Women
 Sibongile Mjekula
 Jennifer Khwela
 Ashleigh Heldsinger

Hockey

Men
 Brendan Botes
 Gareth Carr
 Tim Drummond
 Ian Haley
 Rhett Halkett
 Thomas Hammond
 Marvin Harper
 Julian Hykes
 Lance Louw
 Lloyd Madsen
 Wade Paton
 Lloyd Norris-Jones
 Taine Paton
 Justin Reid-Ross
 Austin Smith

Women
 Tarryn Bright
 Dirkie Chamberlain
Lisa-Marie Deetliefs
 Farah Fredericks
 Lesle-Ann George
 Kim Hubach
 Marcelle Keet
 Kelly Madsen
 Vuyisanani Mangisa
 Marsha Marescia
 Mariette Rix
 Lenise Marais
 Kathleen Taylor
 Nicolene Terblanche
 Roxanne Turner
 Jennifer Wilson

Lawn Bowls

 Tracy-Lee Botha
 Helen Grundlingh
 Susan Nel
 Colleen Piketh
 Brunhilda Roussouw
 Santjie Steyn
 Shaun Addinall
 Gerry Baker
 Bobby Donnelly
 Johann Pierre du Plessis
 Wayne Perry
 Gidion Vermeulen

Manager: Ron Weddell
Coach: Theuns Fraser
Coach: Jessica Henderson

Netball

Chrisna Botha, Erin Burger, Zukelwa Cwaba, Sindisiwe Gumede, Maryke Holtzhausen, Christene Markgraaf, Zanele Mdodane, Nthabiseng Moabi, Precious Mthembu, Amanda Mynhardt, Liezel Wium, Leigh-Ann Zackey. Manager: Marchelle Maroun. Coach: Carin Strauss. Assistant coach: Cecilia Molokwane

Shooting

Tielman Breedt, Martin Davis, Petrus Haasbroek. Coaches: Jacob de Beer and Robert Thompson

Table tennis

Luke Abrahams, Theo Cogill, Kurt Lingeveldt, Itumeleng Molahloe, Shane Overmeyer. Manager/coach: Sameera Maal. Coach: Marcus Gustafsson

Wheelchair Table Tennis: Aletta Moll

Weightlifting

Babalwa Ndleleni, Mona Pretorius, Portia Vries. Manager/coach: Aveenash Pandoo

Wrestling

Sonja Coetzee, Brumilda Leeuw, Mpho Madi, Zumicke Geringer, Richard Addinall, Heinrich Barnes, Bella-Lufa Hughes, Marius Loots, Gerald Meyer, Andries Schutte, Etienne van Huyssteen, Carlo van Wyk, Dean van Zyl. Manager: Sakkie Bosse. Coach: Nico Coetzee

Medical team
Doctors
Chief Medical Officer: Shuiab Manjra. Doctors: Demitri Constantinou, Jo-Anne Kirby

Physiotherapists
Chief Physiotherapist: Caren Fleishman. Physiotherapists: Megan Dutton, Tamlyn Guest, Grace Hughes, Fikile Phasha, Tanushree Pillay, Sandhya Silal, Edwin Bodha, Nhlanhla Maphanga, David van Wyk

See also
 2010 Commonwealth Games

References

Nations at the 2010 Commonwealth Games
2010
2010 in South African sport